The RF&P Subdivision is a railroad line owned and operated by CSX Transportation. It runs from Washington, D.C., to Richmond, Virginia, over lines previously owned by the Pennsylvania Railroad and the Richmond, Fredericksburg and Potomac Railroad. The line's name pays homage to that railroad, which was a predecessor to the CSX.

Route description
At the northern (eastern) end of the line, the RF&P Sub connects to the Capital Subdivision, which runs to Baltimore, Maryland. Just before the Anacostia Railroad Bridge on the Capital Sub is the Virginia Avenue Tunnel. South (west) of the tunnel is a branch to the Amtrak First Street Tunnel, which leads to Union Station and the Northeast Corridor. The Virginia Avenue Tunnel is used only for freight trains, while the First Street Tunnel is used only for passenger trains.

Continuing south, the RF&P Sub crosses the Potomac River over the Long Bridge into Virginia, and passes through Alexandria and Fredericksburg, ending in Richmond at the Richmond Terminal Subdivision.

Current operation
The RF&P Sub is part of CSX's eastern seaboard line, and carries freight trains, as well as passenger trains for Amtrak and Virginia Railway Express (VRE). Freight traffic capacity on the subdivision has been improved by the modernization of the Virginia Avenue Tunnel. The tunnel is now double-tracked and has a higher vertical clearance, which allows the use of double-stack freight cars.  South of Long Bridge is triple tracked until Franconia Station where it reduces to double track.

Proposed modifications
In 2008 CSX proposed improvements to the RF&P Sub in what would be a public-private partnership, as part of its National Gateway initiative. The improvements would enable use of double-stack cars, and include a modified or rebuilt tunnel, and lowering of track levels at several presently-restricted roadway overpasses.

In 2019, the state of Virginia announced that they were purchasing track from CSX along the subdivision in order to expand passenger rail service in Virginia. They will buy the 3rd and 4th tracks where they exist, half of the existing right-of-way, building a new passenger-only long bridge across the Potomac, and will be expanding stations along the line along with more service.

See also
List of CSX Transportation lines

References 

CSX Transportation lines
Pennsylvania Railroad lines
Richmond, Fredericksburg and Potomac Railroad
Rail infrastructure in Virginia
Rail infrastructure in Washington, D.C.